This is a list of mayors of Bath, a city in the county of Somerset, England, since the first recorded mayoralty in 1230.

The mayor for the municipal year beginning 28 May 2022 is Rob Appleyard, who is the 795th mayor.

The Mayor of Bath in 1964 was Councillor Miss Kathleen Harper, the first woman to hold the office

Pre-21st century
Source: Mayor's Office, Bath

1230: John de Porta (first recorded Mayor of Bath)
1237: Henry le Tayleur
1249: Walter Falc. Sir Henry Tailor (Cissor)
1262: Henry the Tailor
1277: Henry the Tailor
1279: Nicholas Biscop
1280: John de Cumbe. William Scleht, Henry Tailor (Cissor)
1283: Richard Tabernarius. Richard Everard
1284: Thomas Sweyn
1285: William Cook (Cocus). Roger de Dichegate. Nicholas Clerk (Clerico). Stephen de Devyses. John de Cumbe. Richard Everard. Gilbert Taylor.
1286: Gilbert Taylor
1290: Stephen Baker. Henry Tailor (Cissor)
1291: Stephen de Devyses
1293: John le Taylor. William Scuel. William Cook (Cocus). Peter le Brevitor
1295: Peter le Brevitor
1299: William Cook (Cocus)
1390–1394: William Rous, MP for Bath
1395: Robert Draper (MP for Bath, 1395)
1404: Richard Widcombe (MP for Bath, 1413–1428)
1416: Walter Rich (MP for Bath, 1414–1435)
1417: Richard Widcombe
1426: Richard Widcombe
1428: Richard Widcombe
1438: Walter Rich
1443: Walter Rich
1530: Thomas Welpley
1550–1551: John Clement, (MP for Bath, 1539)
1551: Edward Ludwell (MP for Bath, 1553)
1554-5: Richard Chapman
1573: William Walley
1575: Thomas Turner (MP for Bath, 1563)
1576–1577: George Pearman (MP for Bath, 1571–72)
1580: William Sharestone (Sherston) (MP for Bath, 1584–1604)
1582: William Walley
1582: George Pearman
1584: William Sharestone
1585: John Walley, Snr (MP for Bath, 1589)
1589: William Sharestone
1595-1598: William Heath
1598: William Sharestone
1603: William Sharestone
1604-1605:Christopher Stone
1613: Richard Gay (MP for Bath, 1626)
1619: Richard Gay
1625: Richard Gay
1631: Richard Gay
1634: Anthony Kingston
1644: John Parker
1656: John Boys
1677 Benjamin Baber
1687 Benjamin Baber
1700 Benjamin Baber
1742: Ralph Allen (postmaster and quarry-owner)
1769: Thomas Warr Attwood (Bath City Architect)
1784: William Street (died in 1785)
1796: John Palmer (Surveyor and Comptroller General of the Post Office, MP for Bath, 1801)
1809: John Palmer
1826: Eleazer Pickwick (director of Somerset Coal Canal)
1837: Simon Barrow (Lansdown Grove, Bath)
1838: Henry Gordon (Rear Admiral)
1844: Henry Gordon
1848: William Sutcliffe
1861: Thomas Jolly
1868: Thomas Jolly
1872–1873 Robert Stickney Blaine (MP for Bath, 1885)
1882–1885: Handel Cossham (MP for Bristol East, 1885)
1893: General Reginald Quintin Mainwaring
1894: William Cracknell Jolly
1896 & 1899: George Woodiwiss
1897: Charles Henry Simpson, Major
1898: John Ricketts (died 13 July 1899)
1899: Robert Edmund Dickinson, MP 
1900: Thomas Ball Silcock
1901: Edward England Phillips
1902: James Edward Henshaw
1903: Charles Henry Simpson, Major 
1904: Benjamin John
1905: Charles Bryan Oliver 
1906: Sydney William Bush 
1907: Thomas Hodgson Miller 
1908: John William Knight
1909: Charles Henry Simpson, Major (second time)
1910: Thomas Ball Silcock (second time)
1911: Thomas Forder Plowman
1912: George Thomas Cooke 
1913: Preston King  
1914: Frederick W. Spear, (Wholesaler and Provision Merchant)
1915: Harry Thomas Hatt 
1916: Charles Henry Long
1917: Preston King  (second time)
1918: Alfred William Wills
1919: Percy Jackman 
1920: James Henry Colmer 
1921: Ernest John White 
1922 & 1924–1928: Cedric Chivers (died 30 January 1929)
1923: Charles Henry Hacker
1929 & 1934: Aubrey Bateman (founder of Bath Royal United Hospital)
1930: Thomas Sturge Cotterell 
1932: Rhodes G Cook 
1933: Horace Scott Davey, Lt Col
1935 & 1939: James Sidney Carpenter, 
1936: Walter Farley Long
1937: Leonard Graham Araham Adams (resigned 6 December 1937)
1937–1938: Adrian E. Hopkins (leading philatelist)
1940–1942: Aubrey Bateman
1944: Joseph Plowman
1951: Reginald Wilfrid Pearson
1952: Alleyne Berry (father of Mary Berry)
1953: Adrian E. Hopkins
1954: William Henry Gallop
1955: Alfred Norman Dix
1956: Sydney Arthur Smith
1957: Tom Jones
1958: Hugh Duckworth Roberts
1959: Edward William Arthur Mortimer
1960: Arthur Cecil Knight
1961: William Henry Jordan Shepherd
1962: Gulielma Law
1963: Royston Ernest Tucker
1964: George Emanuel de Chazal Mayer
1965: Ada Elsie May Hanna
1966: Ronald Harry Purdie
1967: Ronald Fred Emmerson
1968: Roy Gordon Hiscocks
1969: Alexander Stewart Polson
1970: Walter Gower Huggett
1971: Mabel Mary Grosvenor
1972: Alec Louis Ricketts
1973: Thomas John Cornish
1974: William Percy Johns
1975: Cicely Margaret Edmunds
1976: Mary Elizabeth Rawlings
1977: Raymond Charles Rosewarn
1978: Kenneth John Holloway (died 10 December 1978)
1979: George Durant Kersley, (elect 2 January 1979)
1979: John Humphrey Lyons, Major
1980: Brian James Hamlen
1981: Leslie Albert William Ridd, 
1982: Laurence John Harris Coombs
1983: Elgar Spencer Jenkins
1984: Anthony John Rhymes
1985: Jeannette Farley Hole
1986: Samuel Leslie Jane
1987: Ian Charles Dewey
1988: John James Malloy, Commander
1989: Anne Maureen McDonagh
1990: Jeffrey William Higgins
1991: Denis Reginald Lovelace
1992: Eric Jack Trevor Snook
1993: Edwina Harding Bradley
1994: Howard William Routledge
1995: Jeffrey Stephen Manning
1996: Margaret Mary Feeny
1997: Marian Frances Hammond
1998: Ray David Cliffe
1999: John Anthony Bailey

21st century
Source: Mayor's Office, Bath
2000:	Angela Godfrey
2001:	Marian McNeir
2002: 	Loraine Morgan-Brinkhurst
2003:	David James Hawkins
2004:	Roger Alan Symonds
2005:	Peter John Metcalfe
2006:	Carol Ann Paradise
2007:	Sharon Ball
2008:	Tim Ball
2009:	Colin Vincent Barrett
2010:	Shaun McGall
2011:	Bryan Chalker
2012:	Andrew Furse
2013:	Malcolm John Henry Lees
2014:  Cherry Beath
2015:	Will Sandry
2016:  Paul Crossley
2017:  Ian Gilchrist
2018:  Patrick Anketell-Jones
2019:  Gerry Curran
2020:  Manda Rigby
2021:  June Player
2022:  Rob Appleyard

See also
Bath, Somerset#Charter trustees

References

External links
Official website

Mayors
Bath
Mayors